Mukhtor Kurbonov (born 26 January 1975) is former Uzbek professional footballer and coach. He currently coach of Shurtan. As player he played in position of midfielder.

Playing career
He started playing career in Temiryo'lchi Qo'qon in 1992. After playing 3 seasons in Kokand, he moved to MHSK Tashkent where he won Oliy League in 1997. In 1999-2000 he played for Dustlik and twice won Oliy League titles and Uzbek Cup in 2000 with club. He also played for several Kazakhstani clubs: Kairat (2003), Yassy Sayram (2004) and Zhetysu (2005). 

Kurbonov played for Uzbekistan and was part of team in the 2000 Asian Cup. Kurbonov capped totally 15 matches for national team. With 152 goals he is member of Gennadi Krasnitsky club. Totally he scored 133 goals in Oliy League matches for different clubs.

Managing career
On 8 January 2015 he started coaching in Shurtan Guzar.

Honours

Club
Temiryo'lchi
 Uzbek Cup runner-up: 1992

MHSK Tashkent
 Uzbek League (1): 1997
 Uzbek Cup runner-up: 1995

Navbahor
 Uzbek Cup (1): 1998

Dustlik
 Uzbek League (2): 1999, 2000
 Uzbek Cup (1): 2000

Pakhtakor
 Uzbek Cup (1): 2001

Kairat
 Kazakhstan Cup (1): 2003

Individual
 Gennadi Krasnitsky club: 152 goals

References

External links
11v11 Profile

1975 births
Living people
Uzbekistani footballers
FK Neftchi Farg'ona players
navbahor Namangan players
FC Dustlik players
Pakhtakor Tashkent FK players
FC Kairat players
FC Zhetysu players
Traktor Tashkent players
FC Shurtan Guzar players
FC Sogdiana Jizzakh players
FC AGMK players
Association football midfielders
Uzbekistani expatriate footballers
Uzbekistan international footballers
2000 AFC Asian Cup players
Expatriate footballers in Kazakhstan
Uzbekistani expatriate sportspeople in Kazakhstan